Josephine Chu (born 16 December 1950) is a Taiwanese former politician. She served in the Legislative Yuan from 1996 to 2002. Chu and Hsu Hsin-liang formed an independent ticket in the 2000 presidential election, finishing fourth.

Early life, education and career
Chu, born in 1950, is of Mainlander descent. She received a Ph.D. in art and archaeology from Princeton University in 1990 after completing a doctoral dissertation titled "The Chung Yu (A.D. 151-230) tradition: a pivotal development in Sung calligraphy." She was then a research fellow at the National Palace Museum.

Political career
Chu served two terms in the Legislative Yuan, winning the 1995 and 1998 elections. Throughout her legislative career, she was occasionally covered in local media as a New Party politician, but most often as an independent. Chu and Hsu Hsin-liang formed an independent ticket in the 2000 presidential election, won by Chen Shui-bian and Annette Lu. Chu ran for the Hsinchu district seat in the legislative elections of 2001 with the endorsement of the Gender Sexuality Rights Association, but lost.

Political stances
Chu has worked to expand LGBT rights in Taiwan, and has advocated for rights of foreign spouses.

Chu backed efforts to maintain an unbiased media, as well as cultural outreach initiatives. To this end, she supported a proposal by the Taiwan Media Watch Foundation to have government workers barred from working in the media, and has criticized political interference in the Public Television Service. In 2001, she expressed support for expanding the National Palace Museum to southern Taiwan, a project that was not completed until 2015.

When the United States government announced that it would not ratify the Kyoto Protocol, Chu sought a meeting with the American Institute in Taiwan to argue for the ratification of the treaty. In 2004, she criticized the Chen Shui-bian administration for backing a NT$610.8 billion proposal to acquire American weapons, saying that the results of the Cross-Strait referendum showed that most Taiwanese did not approve of the action.

Later career
After leaving politics, Chu taught at Taipei National University of the Arts. In 2009, she returned to the National Palace Museum as assistant director of educational outreach, assuming the departmental head position the next year.

References

1950 births
Living people
Taipei Members of the Legislative Yuan
Members of the 3rd Legislative Yuan
Members of the 4th Legislative Yuan
New Party Members of the Legislative Yuan
Princeton University alumni
20th-century Taiwanese women politicians
Taiwanese LGBT rights activists
Academic staff of Taipei National University of the Arts
National Palace Museum
21st-century Taiwanese women politicians
Taiwanese people of Chinese descent